BBC In Session is a compilation of four BBC sessions by the La's, containing the band's session appearances on radio shows hosted by Janice Long, Liz Kershaw, Bob Harris and Nicky Campbell. The songs were compiled from recording sessions starting September 2, 1987 with the last track being recorded October 7, 1990. The album was released on September 18, 2006 to small scale acclaim, being given generally favorable reviews from the outlets that ranked it. AllMusic makes the claim that this album could possibly be the closest example of the “rootsy, stripped back sound” that Lee Mavers was attempting to achieve on the La’s debut album, but this is disputed due to material from the La’s being in such short supply.

Track listing

Personnel
The La's
 Lee Mavers – lead vocals, guitar
 John Power – bass, backing vocals
 Paul Hemmings – guitar (tracks 1-4)
 John Timson (credited as Timo Timson) – drums (tracks 1-4)
 Iain Templeton – drums (tracks 5-8)
 Chris Sharrock – drums (tracks 9-13)
 Barry Sutton – guitar (tracks 9-13)
 Neil Mavers – drums (tracks 14-17)
 Peter Cammell (credited as Peter Camille) – guitar (tracks 14-17)

Production
 Peter Watts – producer (tracks 1-8)
 Phil Stannard – engineer (tracks 1-4)
 Fred Kay – engineer (tracks 1-4)
 Martyn Parker – engineer (tracks 5-13)
 Harry Parker – producer (tracks 9-13)
 Miti Adhikari – producer (tracks 14-17)
 Paul Allen – engineer (tracks 14-17)
 M.W. Macefield – liner notes

References 

The La's albums
BBC Radio recordings
2006 live albums
2006 compilation albums
Universal Records compilation albums
Universal Records live albums